The Stolpersteine in Weingarten lists all Stolpersteine that have been collocated in Weingarten in the very south of Germany. Stolpersteine is the German name for stumbling blocks collocated all over Europe by German artist Gunter Demnig. They remember the fate of the Nazi victims being murdered, deported, exiled or driven to suicide.

Generally, the stumbling blocks are posed in front of the building where the victims had their last self chosen residence. Stolperschwellen are much larger and they usually remember a group of victims.

Stolperschwellen

Stolperstein

Date of collocations 
The Stolperschwellen and the Stolperstein of Weingarten were collocated by the artist himself on 17 April 2013.

See also 
 List of cities by country that have stolpersteine
 Stolpersteine in Germany

External links
 stolpersteine.eu, Demnig's website

References

Weingarten
Stolpersteine
Holocaust commemoration